Joseph E. McDermid was a member of the Wisconsin State Senate.

Biography
McDermid was born on March 20, 1894 in Minneapolis, Minnesota. During World War I, he served in the United States Army Medical Corps. He was a member of the American Legion.

Political career
McDermid was elected to the Senate in a special election in April 1935. Additionally, he was a member of the Rusk County, Wisconsin Board of Supervisors. He was a member of the Wisconsin Progressive Party.

References

External links
The Political Graveyard

Politicians from Minneapolis
People from Rusk County, Wisconsin
Wisconsin state senators
Wisconsin Progressives (1924)
20th-century American politicians
Military personnel from Wisconsin
United States Army Medical Corps officers
United States Army officers
United States Army personnel of World War I
1894 births
Year of death missing